Turkvision Song Contest 2013 was the inaugural edition of the Turkvision Song Contest, held in Eskişehir, Turkey. Twenty-four Turkic regions, which have either a large Turkic population or a widely spoken Turkic language, participated in the contest. The semi-final took place on 19 December 2013, while the final took place on 21 December 2013.

Location

Eskişehir is a city in northwestern Turkey and the capital of the Eskişehir Province. According to the 2011 census, the population of the city is 711,396. The city is located on the banks of the Porsuk River, 792 m above sea level, where it overlooks the fertile Phrygian Valley. In the nearby hills one can find hot springs. Known as a university town, both Eskişehir Osmangazi University and Anadolu University (which has one of the largest student enrollments in the world) are based in Eskişehir.

Format
The contest consisted of a semi-final held on 19 December 2013, and a grand final which took place on the evening of 21 December 2013. The twenty-four participating regions took part in the semi-final, of which twelve qualified and proceeded to the grand final.

Voting was done by one juror from each country. These jurors did not have to have any music industry experience. The scoring method and how each participating country/region was not announced, however they were allowed to vote for their own country/region.

National host broadcaster
Turkish Radio and Television Corporation (TRT) was the host broadcaster for the inaugural contest. The contest was broadcast by TRT on TRT Avaz, TRT Music and TRT Anadolu.

Participation
A total of twenty-four Turkic-related areas took part in the first edition of the contest. Previously-announced competitors Turkmenistan, Chuvashia, Russia, and Xinjiang were not part of the final lineup announced on 17 December.

Semi-final
The semi-final took place on 19 December 2013. Twelve regions qualified and proceeded to the grand final.

Final
The final took place on 21 December 2013. Twelve semi-final qualifiers participated.

National jury members
Each participating country is represented by one jury member,

  - Vladymyr Konchev
  - Govhar Hasanzadeh
  - Aygul Akhmadeeva
  - 
  - Ahmed Švrakić
  - Seyran Mambetov
  - Piotr Petkovic
  - Giorgi Chomakashvili
  - Fethullah Ahmed Salih
  - Nadezhda Hadzhieva
  - Kydyrali Bolmanov
  - Ismet Zaatov
  - German Tambaev
  - Elif Tokmak
  - 
  - Eran Hasip
  - Ertan Birinci
  - Mioara Girba-Tuțu
  - 
  - Ahmet Koç
  - 
  - Enver Ismayilov
  - 
  -

International Broadcast
Each participating broadcaster is expected to show the contest live enabling the public to vote in the contest. The broadcasters that have been confirmed so far are:

   – STRC "Altai Mountains"
   – ATV Azerbaijan
   – Kuray Television
   – Hayat TV
   – Crimea Public Radio and Television
   – GRT Television
   – Kumeo Kartlia Television
  - 9 Volna
  - 9 Volna
   – Adam Media Group
   – RTK Television
   – Piramida Television
   – MRT 2
   – GENC Television
   – Alpha TV Media
   – Maydan Television
   – Kral TV
Non-participating
   – Bengu Turk (final)
   – TMV Television

The following participating countries and regions have yet to announce details of their broadcasting stations.

 
 
 
 
 
 
 
 
  Yakutia

See also
 Eurovision Song Contest 2013
 Junior Eurovision Song Contest 2013
 ABU TV Song Festival 2013
 European Broadcasting Union

References

External links
 
 

2013 in Turkey
Turkish music
Turkvision Song Contest by year
Culture in Eskişehir
2013 song contests
December 2013 events in Turkey